Poolampatti is a panchayat town in Salem district in the Indian state of Tamil Nadu. This is located on one of the banks of river Kaveri.

The main occupation is agriculture here. With this, cattle also adds to the sources of income.

Demographics
 India census, Poolampatti had a population of 9000. Males constitute 52% of the population and females 48%. Poolampatti has an average literacy rate of 56%, lower than the national average of 59.5%. Male literacy is 66%, and female literacy is 45%. In Poolampatti, 10% of the population is under 6 years of age.

Tourist attractions 
 Sri Kailasanathar Temple-one of the ancient Siva temples

References

Cities and towns in Salem district